Gerald "Gerry" Lockwood (16 December 1927 – 23 February 2015) was an English professional rugby league footballer who played in the 1940s and 1950s.

Background
Gerry Lockwood was born in Lupset, Wakefield, West Riding of Yorkshire, England, he worked as a plumber, and he died aged 87 in Wakefield, West Yorkshire, England.

Playing career
Gerry Lockwood made his début for Wakefield Trinity, and scored 4-goals in the 32-3 victory over Hull Kingston Rovers at Belle Vue on Saturday 14 January 1956, he scored 2-goals in the 10-14 defeat by Barrow in the 1956 Challenge Cup quarter final at Belle Vue in front of a crowd of 20,514, he scored a goal in the 5-9 defeat by Keighley during the 1955–56 season at Lawkholme Lane, Keighley. With Frank Mortimer's return to fitness, Gerry Lockwood was restricted to 'A' Team appearances, but with  Mortimer playing for Great Britain against Australia, Gerry Lockwood made his only appearance of the 1956–57 season in the match against the Featherstone Rovers at Post Office Road, Featherstone on Saturday 17 November 1956, this was to be his last match, as 2-weeks later, aged 28, he suffered a broken leg during an 'A' Team match that ended his rugby league playing career.

References

External links
Search for "Lockwood" at rugbyleagueproject.org

1927 births
2015 deaths
English rugby league players
Halifax R.L.F.C. players
Keighley Cougars players
Rugby league fullbacks
Rugby league players from Wakefield
Wakefield Trinity players